Leptodactylus diedrus is a species of frog in the family Leptodactylidae. Its local name is sapito confuso ("confused toadlet"). It is found in northwestern Amazon Basin in Brazil, Colombia, Venezuela, and Peru. Leptodactylus diedrus are found in rocky habitats in tropical rainforest as well as in flooded forest.

References

Diedrus
Amphibians of Brazil
Amphibians of Colombia
Amphibians of Peru
Amphibians of Venezuela
Amphibians described in 1994
Taxonomy articles created by Polbot